Rymovirus is a genus of viruses, in the family Potyviridae. Plants serve as natural hosts. There are three species in this genus.

Taxonomy
The genus contains the following species:
Agropyron mosaic virus
Hordeum mosaic virus
Ryegrass mosaic virus

Structure
Viruses in Rymovirus are non-enveloped, with flexuous and filamentous geometries. The diameter is around 11-15 nm, with a length of 200-300 nm. Genomes are linear and non-segmented, bipartite, around 9-10kb in length.

Life cycle
Viral replication is cytoplasmic. Entry into the host cell is achieved by penetration into the host cell. Replication follows the positive stranded RNA virus replication model. Positive stranded RNA virus transcription is the method of transcription. The virus exits the host cell by tubule-guided viral movement.
Plants serve as the natural host. The virus is transmitted via a vector (mite). Transmission routes are vector and mechanical.

References

External links
 Viralzone: Rymovirus
 ICTV

Potyviridae
Virus genera